East Branch Cold Spring Creek is a river in Delaware County, New York. It drains Beales Pond and converges with Cold Spring Creek north of Stilesville.

References

Rivers of New York (state)
Rivers of Delaware County, New York